A television set is a device which receives television broadcasting.

Television set may also refer to:

 A television studio
 Set (film and TV scenery)
 The TV Set, a 2006 film

See also
 Television (disambiguation)